Musa Avsever (born 7 November 1957) is a Turkish Army general who is the 52nd and current commander of the Turkish Land Forces. Prior to his appointment as a commander of the Land Forces on 5 August 2021, he served as the 57th commander of the First Army of Turkey from 2016 to 2021.

Career 
Avsever was born in Konya, Turkey. He completed his high school education at Kuleli Military High School. He obtained his graduation from the Turkish Military Academy as a signal officer in 1978. He was enlisted in the Army as a platoon and was appointed at the 7th Corps between 1979 and 1982. Later he was posted at the School and Training Centre of Communications, Electronics and Information System between 1986 and 1988. He graduated with military courses from the Army War College in 1990 and was subsequently appointed as branch commander of the 2nd Infantry Division where he served to the post from 1990 until he was appointed as logistics division officer at the Second Army's headquarter where he served in 1992 unit 1996. After completing his assignments in 1996, he was appointed as cadet battalion commander and chief of Operations and Training branch, Turkish Military Academy from 1996 to 1999.

In the Cyprus Turkish Peace Force Command, he served as chief of Operations and Training branch from 1999 unit he was appointed as commander of the 5th Border Regiment in 2001 to 2003.

Avsever was promoted to the rank of brigadier general in 2003 by the Supreme Military Council and then he was appointed as head of the Land Forces for Supply and Maintenance branch where he served from 2003 to 2005. He also served as a support commander at the General Staff of the Turkish Armed Forces for Communications, Electronics and Information System branch from 2005 to 2007.

In 2007 he was promoted to the rank of major general and was subsequently appointed as the head of Communications, Electronics and Information System branch of the Land Forces where he remained in the office until 2009 when he was appointed as commander of Land Forces School and Training Centre of Communications, Electronics and Information System unit 2011. He also served as a chief of staff in the Aegean Army from 2011 to 2012.

With the promotion of his rank to lieutenant general in 2012 he was appointed head of the Chief of the Turkish General Staff headquarters for Communications, Electronics and Information System from 2012 to 2015. He also served as a commander of the 2nd Corps from 2015 to 2016.

After he completed his assignment at the 2nd Corps, he was promoted to the rank of general and was subsequently appointed as a commander of the First Army from 2016 to 2021.

References 

Living people
1957 births
Chiefs of the Turkish General Staff
Commanders of the First Army of Turkey
Commanders of the Turkish Land Forces
Kuleli Military High School alumni
Turkish Military Academy alumni
Army War College (Turkey) alumni